Sun Yeli (born 9 December 1964) is a Chinese politician who is the current director of the State Council Information Office and a deputy head of the Publicity Department of the Chinese Communist Party.

Biography
Sun was born in Anqiu County (now Anqiu), Shandong, on 9 December 1964. He received his bachelor's degree and master's degree from Peking University in 1985 and 1988, respectively. Starting in July 1988, he served in several posts in the Party Documents Research Office of the CCP Central Committee, including deputy secretary-general, director of the Fifth Editorial Department, and deputy director. He became deputy president of the Institute of Party History and Literature of the CCP Central Committee in March 2018, and served until January 2021, when he was appointed deputy head of the Publicity Department of the Chinese Communist Party. He was a representative of the 20th National Congress of the Chinese Communist Party. On 15 October 2022, he concurrently served as spokesman of the 20th National Congress of the Chinese Communist Party. On 17 January 2023, he was appointed as the director of the State Council Information Office.

Publication

References

1964 births
Living people
People from Anqiu
Peking University alumni
People's Republic of China politicians from Shandong
Chinese Communist Party politicians from Shandong